Gabriel Acevero (born October 23, 1990) is an American organizer, activist and politician representing Maryland's 39th House district. On November 6, 2018, Acevero finished in first place with 31% of the vote and became the first openly gay Afro-Latino, and one of the youngest people, elected to the Maryland House of Delegates. He is a member of Phi Beta Sigma fraternity.

Early life, education, and career

Acevero was born on October 23, 1990, in San Fernando, Trinidad; the youngest of six children to Ingrid (née Renn), a government employee and labor activist and Michael Acevero, an insurance agent. His paternal family are Afro-Venezuelan and his mother is Afro-Trinidadian. Acevero was raised in the town of Couva and attended Richmond Street Boys Anglican School in the capital, Port-of-Spain. He graduated from Couva Government Secondary School in 2007, where he excelled on the school's debate team and his family immigrated to the United States later that year, settling in Maryland. Acevero started college at 16, earning his associate degree in international relations from Montgomery College and a bachelor's degree in political science from the University of Maryland Baltimore County (UMBC) in 2011 at the age of 20. He was a student activist in college, volunteered for political campaigns and was active in the state Democratic Party.

Acevero worked as an issue organizer after college, first on the successful Question 4 (Maryland Dream Act) and Question 6 (Marriage Equality) campaigns in 2012—Maryland became the first state to approve both measures at the ballot box—and then in 2014 on transgender equality. He was recognized by the National Black Justice Coalition as one of its "100 Black LGBTQ Emerging Leaders to Watch" for his advocacy and efforts to reform Maryland's justice system.

A Black Lives Matter activist, Acevero helped organize and was involved in protests during the 2015 Freddie Gray unrest in Baltimore City. Acevero joined the coalition of activists and organizations that advocated for the repeal of Maryland's Law Enforcement Officers Bill of Rights (LEOBR) following Freddie Gray's death. Prior to running for office, he was involved in decarceration efforts in Maryland.

Acevero joined the Maryland Fight for $15 campaign and organized low wage workers and community groups to support raising the minimum wage in Montgomery County. The County Council overwhelmingly approved the bill and it was signed into law in 2017.

In December 2017, Acevero was among a group of activists, labor leaders, clergy and lawmakers who were arrested on the steps of Capitol Hill for engaging in unlawful demonstration. The group was hoping to pressure Congress to include legislation for undocumented immigrants who came to the US as children. He was also behind the push that led to the renaming of an Elementary School in honor of gay Civil Rights leader, Bayard Rustin. In his testimony before the Montgomery County Board of Education, Acevero criticized the Trump administration's decision to remove LGBTQ people off the US Census and the transgender military ban: "We have a hostile administration that is intent on erasing LGBTQ folks, recently taking us off the Census and banning transgender Americans from serving their country. Now more than ever we need to affirm LGBTQ youth, and that's why Bayard Rustin is such a powerful name for this school". The Montgomery County Board of Education voted to approve the renaming of the school.

Acevero ran in the three-member house district which includes parts of Gaithersburg, Germantown, Clarksburg, Montgomery Village, and Washington Grove. He won the Democratic primary on June 26, 2018, besting three-term incumbent Delegate Kirill Reznik and two-term incumbent, Delegate Shane Robinson in the hotly contested primary. He faced nominal Republican opposition in the general and was elected on November 6, 2018, at the age of 28. Acevero was sworn in on a copy of James Baldwin's 1963 book, The Fire Next Time and assumed office on January 9, 2019.

In the 2022 Democratic primary, other members of the house district campaigned for another Democrat to replace Acevero, who nonetheless won reelection to the ticket.

Maryland Legislature
Acevero sits on the House Appropriations Committee and is a member of the Maryland Legislative Black Caucus, the Latino Legislative Caucus and the Montgomery County Delegation.

Personal life
Acevero is one of seven openly LGBTQ+ members of the Maryland General Assembly.

Political positions

Cannabis
In 2022, Acevero voted in support of cannabis legalization and voted in favor of HB 1, "Constitutional Amendment – Cannabis – Adult Use and Possession." He was one of two Democrats to vote against House Bill 837, another Cannabis Reform bill, to study the racial impacts of cannabis legalization, create a public health fund, alter civil and criminal penalties and create a process of expungement for possession of the drug. Acevero stated that while he supported cannabis legalization, he believed that there were "aspects of legalization that he believes need to addressed before the state can move forward". He said the bill "does not create true racial equity related to minority ownerships of licensed growing, processing and dispensing businesses." Delegate Acevero has introduced his own bill HB HB1342, Cannabis - Legalization and Regulation (Cannabis Legalization and Equity Act), in 2022 which legalized"the possession and use of a certain amount of cannabis by a person of at least a certain age; providing for expungement of records, dismissal of charges, and commutation of sentences in certain cases involving cannabis-related charges; providing for a system of regulation of the sale of cannabis by the Maryland Department of Health and local jurisdictions; and providing for the taxation of the sale of cannabis in the State."

Criminal justice
Although he serves on the Appropriations Committee, Acevero has primarily introduced criminal justice legislation to include police reform. He has sponsored legislation to restrict police officers' use of force, and to repeal Maryland's Law Enforcement Officer's Bill of Rights.

During his first session as a delegate, Acevero introduced "Anton's Law", a bill that reformed the Maryland Public Information Act, to require transparency in investigations of complaints against law enforcement officers. The bill was named for Anton Black, a 19-year-old African-American man who died in police custody in Greensboro, Maryland. In July 2020, Acevero accused local union leaders of using "strong-arm tactics" to slow down Anton's Law. Gino Renne, president of Montgomery County Government Employees Organization Local 1994 (MCGEO), had expressed concern over Acevero's support of the legislation, asking him to attend a meeting where Acevero claims Renne and others pressured him to drop Anton's Law. Renne fiercely denied Acevero's accusations, calling them a "bold-face lie". During the 2021 legislative session, the Maryland General Assembly passed Anton's Law as part of the Maryland Police Accountability Act of 2021 and it took effect on October 1, 2021.

During the 2021 legislative session, Acevero introduced legislation to prohibit school districts from contracting with local law enforcement agencies to station school resource officers in public schools.

Education
During the 2020 legislative session, Acevero supported the expansion of funding support to public schools in Maryland as proposed by the Kirwan Commission. Acevero noted that "What we're trying to do here is change the trajectory of this state ... All of us will win when we invest in education". He also sponsored the Commission on History, Culture, and Civics in Education "to make recommendations to the State Board of Education and the State Department of Education to further the discovery, interpretation, and learning of the history, culture, and civics of the United States and Maryland; and requiring the Commission to report its findings and recommendations to the State Board, the Governor and the General Assembly by December 30 each year beginning in 2022."

Health care
During the 2020 legislative session, Acevero and state senator Jill P. Carter introduced legislation to establish a universal single-payer health care system in Maryland.

Immigration
In 2021, Acevero spoke in support of the Dignity Not Detention Act that would prevent counties from contracting with U.S. Immigration and Customs Enforcement (ICE). Delegate Acevero described the tactics of ICE as being similar to the Gestapo during World War II.

National politics
In December 2019, Acevero attended a rally in Gaithersburg, Maryland to support the impeachment of Donald Trump.

In 2020 Delegate Acevero endorsed Senator Bernie Sanders for the 2020 Democratic Party presidential primaries.

Redistricting
In 2019, Acevero was the lone dissenting vote in the Maryland General Assembly on a motion to allow Republican legislators to introduce a bill to change the boundaries of Maryland's 6th and 8th congressional districts due to a U.S. District Court for the District of Maryland ruling. Because this legislation came to the Assembly close to the end of the legislative session and did not follow the Court's suggestion of using an -partisan redistricting commission to draw the new borders, Acevero could not support the bill in its present condition.

In 2021, Acevero was the only Democrat in the entire Maryland General Assembly to vote against House Bill 1, the legislature's congressional redistricting plan, citing concerns of the heavy use of Gerrymandering and splitting up of communities. He also voted present on amendments to replace the map created by the Legislative Redistricting Advisory Commission with one drawn by the Maryland Citizens Redistricting Commission. He called on legislators from both parties to support the For the People Act, due to its creation of state-level commissions for drawing Congressional Lines. In 2022 the Maryland Congressional Map was ruled to be unconstitutional, "the first Democratic-drawn map to be struck down by a court this redistricting cycle in what the judge called a 'product of extreme partisan gerrymandering.'"

Social issues
In 2019, Acevero helped write a bill regarding diaper-changing stations in men's restrooms and worked on school funding issues.

In 2020, Acevero co-sponsored legislation to look into the possibility of distributing reparations to the descendants of enslaved Africans in Maryland.

Universal basic income
Acevero supports universal basic income, introducing legislation during the 2019 legislative session to direct 25% of the income generated from medical and recreational cannabis taxation is redirected into an investment account and the returns are then proportionally given to the citizens of Maryland.  House Bill 1089 was referred to the House Appropriations Committee but did not move out of committee. Acevero called the idea as a "form of social security, and it is one of the most transformative policies that we can enact at the state and federal level to put a dent in extreme poverty," and pointed to Alaska's use of it to combat income inequality.

Awards and honors
The National Black Justice Coalition named Acevero one of its "100 Black LGBTQ Emerging Leaders to Watch" in 2015.

The Advocate magazine named Acevero one of its "50 Champions of Pride" in its June 2018 issue.

The G-Listed named Acevero one of its "Black LGBTQ Power 100 in 2018," and LGBTQ Nation named him one of its 10 favorite LGBTQ candidates of 2018.

See also
List of Democratic Socialists of America who have held office in the United States

References

External links

Campaign Website

1990 births
21st-century American politicians
African-American state legislators in Maryland
Gay politicians
Hispanic and Latino American state legislators in Maryland
LGBT African Americans
LGBT Hispanic and Latino American people
LGBT state legislators in Maryland
American gay men
Living people
Maryland socialists
Democratic Party members of the Maryland House of Delegates
Democratic Socialists of America politicians from Maryland
Montgomery College alumni
University of Maryland, Baltimore County alumni
Trinidad and Tobago emigrants to the United States
21st-century African-American politicians